Merlyna Lim is a scholar studying ICT (information and communication ctudies), particularly on the socio-political shaping of new media in non-Western contexts. She has been appointed a Canada Research Chair in Digital Media and Global Network Society in the School of Journalism and Communication Carleton University. Formerly she was a visiting research scholar at Princeton University's Center for Information Technology Policy and a distinguished scholar of technology and public engagement of the  School of Social Transformation Justice and Social Inquiry Program and the Consortium for Science, Policy and Outcomes at Arizona State University. She previously held a networked public research associate position at the Annenberg Center for Communication at the University of Southern California, Los Angeles. She received her PhD, with distinction (cum laude), from University of Twente in Enschede, Netherlands, with a dissertation entitled @rchipelago Online: The Internet and Political Activism in Indonesia.

Lim has given keynote speeches, public lectures, and various academic presentations in more than 150 occasions all over the world, including  keynote speeches at the 2012 Ray Warren Multicultural Symposium (Portland, OR), the 2012 Frank Church Symposium on International Affairs (Pocatello, ID),  the International Conference on Civic Space (ICCS) in 2010 in Jakarta, Indonesia, and a plenary lecture at the Annual Conference of the Association of Internet Researchers (AoIR) in 2006 in Brisbane, Australia.

Lim is also an active blogger, with blogs in English, Indonesian, and Sundanese.

Awards and honors
2019 Graduate Mentoring Award, Carleton University
2016 Elected a member of Royal Society of Canada's College of New Scholars, Artists and Scientists 
2014 Canada Research Chair in Digital Media and Global Network Society 
2013 Visiting Fellowship, Princeton University's Center for Information Technology Policy 
2011 Selected as one of Indonesian 100 Most Inspiring Women—2011 Kartini Awards 
2010 Our Common Future Fellowship in 'Future Technologies' from the Volkswagen Foundation 
2009 Faculty Star of Global Minds from ASU College of Liberal Arts and Sciences.  
2005-2006 Walter Annenberg funded Networked Publics Fellowship, Annenberg Center for Communication, Univ of Southern California, Los Angeles.
2004 Henry Luce funded Southeast Asia Fellowship, East West Center Washington, Washington D.C.
2003 Oxford and Open society Institute Summer Doctoral Scholarship at Oxford Internet Institute.
2003-2004 WOTRO-DC Fellowship from the Netherlands Foundation for the Advancement of Tropical Research (NWO-WOTRO)
2002 American Society of Information Technology and Science (ASIST) International Paper Contest Winner.

Publications
Lim, M. (2012). Life is Local in the Imagined Global Community: Islam and Politics in the Indonesian Blogosphere, Journal of Media and Religion, Vol. 11(2).
Lim, M. (2012).  Clicks, Cabs, Coffee Houses: Social Media and the Oppositional Movements in Egypt (2004–2011), Journal of Communication, Vol. 62(02, April), 231–248.
Agarwal, N., Lim, M., & Wigand, R. (2012) Online Collective Action and the Role of Social Media in Mobilizing Opinions: A Case Study on Women's Right-to-Drive Campaigns in Saudi Arabia, in C. G. Reddick & S. K. Aikins (eds.), Web 2.0 Technologies and Democratic Governance: Political, Policy and Management Implications. 
Agarwal, N., Lim, M., & Wigand, R. (2012)  Raising and Rising Voices: Cyber-Collective Movements in the Female Muslim Blogosphere, Business & Information Systems Engineering Journal. 
Lim, M. (2011). Democratised/Corporatised: Contesting Media in the Post-Authoritarian Indonesia, in Puddephatt, A. et al., A New Frontier, An Old Landscape, Global Partners & Associates, pp. 156–181.
Lim, M. (2011) Radical Islamism in Indonesia and Its Middle Eastern Connections, The Middle East Review of International Affairs Journal.
Lim, M. (2011) Transient Civic Spaces in Jakarta Indonesia in Mike Douglass, KC Ho, Ooi Giok Ling (eds.) Globalization, the City and Civil Society in Pacific Asia, London: Routledge (2nd edition).
Lim, M. (2009)  "Muslim Voices in the Blogosphere: Mosaics of Local-Global Discourses" in Gerard Goggin and Mark McLelland [eds.], Internationalizing Internet: Beyond Anglophone Paradigm, London: Routledge, p. 178-195.
Lim, M and Padawangi, R. (2008), "Contesting Alun-Alun: Power Relations, Identities, and The Production of Urban Spaces in Bandung, Indonesia" International Development and Planning Review, Vol. 30 (3), pp. 307–326.
Lim, M. and Kann, M. (2008), "Politics: Deliberation, Mobilization and Networked Practices of Agitation" in K. Varnelis (ed.) Networked Publics, Cambridge: MIT Press, p. 77-107.
Lim, M. (2008), "Bundling Meta-Narratives on the Internet: Conflict in Maluku" in Shyam Tekwani (ed.), Media and Conflict in Asia, Marshall Cavendish Academic.

References

https://web.archive.org/web/20141020074301/http://scholar.princeton.edu/merlynal
http://www.asu.edu/clas/justice/faculty-staff/MerlynaLim.html
https://web.archive.org/web/20070927003910/http://www.cspo.org/about/people/lim.htm

https://web.archive.org/web/20070610025900/http://conferences.aoir.org/program.php?pdf=1&cf=5
https://web.archive.org/web/20070927045911/http://www.nwo.nl/nwohome.nsf/pages/NWOP_6FRGN4_Eng?Opendocument
https://web.archive.org/web/20070211202447/http://larvatusprodeo.net/2006/09/26/things-internetty/
https://web.archive.org/web/20070830153736/http://dialogue.media-culture.org.au/node/20

Living people
Indonesian bloggers
Indonesian women bloggers
American social sciences writers
Indonesian social scientists
American social scientists
University of Twente alumni
Arizona State University faculty
Canada Research Chairs
Year of birth missing (living people)